Dianno A. Jakelj, (born 26 October 1972, in Ljubljana, Slovenia) is an  abstract painter.

In 1997, his then three-year-old eldest daughter suffered neurological damage following a rabies vaccination after she had been bitten by an unidentified mammal while on vacation. Jakelj and his family entered a protracted lawsuit against the state. Jakelj indicates that he began painting after her injury due to her love of art.

In 2001, he founded the charitable foundation "4 Help 2 Children", which he supports with a portion of the proceeds from his painting.
In 2013 he had four exhibitions in two months:

Slovenian National Gallery in Ljubljana ( March 2013)
Špas Theatre Mengeš Slovenia ( April 2013)
Monaco, Grimaldi Forum, the Art Monaco ( April 2013)
Barranquilla, Colombia, Barranquillaart ( April, May 2013)

His artworks have been privately auctioned by Christie's Auction Company in Monaco and Barranquillarte.

References

External links
Official personal website
WorldNew video of auction

Living people
1972 births
Abstract painters
Slovenian painters
Slovenian male painters
People from Jesenice, Jesenice